Ramon Ramos Limas (born 13 March 2001), commonly known as Ramon, is a Brazilian professional footballer who plays as a left-back for Super League Greece club Olympiacos.

Career

Flamengo

Red Bull Bragantino (loan)
On 8 April 2022 Flamengo loaned Ramon to Red Bull Bragantino until 31 December 2022. Ramon had a total of 19 appearances in all competitions, 9 of those as a starter.

Olympiacos
On 19 January 2023 was announced Ramon's transfer to Olympiacos, the Greek side agreed to pay a €1.5m transfer fee and Flamengo kept 30% of a future transfer.

Career statistics

Club

Honours

Club
Flamengo
Campeonato Brasileiro Série A: 2020
Campeonato Carioca: 2019, 2020, 2021

References

2001 births
Living people
Brazilian footballers
Association football defenders
Campeonato Brasileiro Série A players
Nova Iguaçu Futebol Clube players
CR Flamengo footballers
Red Bull Bragantino players
Olympiacos F.C. players
People from São João de Meriti
Sportspeople from Rio de Janeiro (state)
Brazilian expatriate footballers
Brazilian expatriate sportspeople in Greece
Expatriate footballers in Greece